This is a list of notable fruit dishes. Fruit dishes are those that use fruit as a primary ingredient. Condiments prepared with fruit as a primary ingredient are also included in this list.

Fruit dishes

 
 
 
 
 
 
  or Burfi , an Indian subcontinent sweet dish which can be made from fruits like Coconut,Orange and Mango.
 
 
 
 
  – Single-layer cake with berries
 
 
 
 
 
 
 
  – fruit baked with a topping of biscuits
 
 
 
  – fruit baked with a sugary, streusel-like topping, generally containing oats or nuts (or both)
 
 
 
 
 
 
 
 
 
 
 
 
 Fruit relish
 
 
 
 
  .Banana Halwa is sweet dish made from ripe banana

Apple dishes

Banana dishes

Cherry dishes

Grape dishes

Lemon dishes

Melon dishes

Pies

Plum dishes

Puddings

Strawberry dishes

See also

 List of chutneys
 List of coconut dishes
 List of culinary fruits
 List of juices
 List of fruit liqueurs
 List of melon dishes
 List of squash and pumpkin dishes
 List of vegetable dishes
 Lists of prepared foods
 Thai fruit carving

References

 
Fruit dishes